Marc Mysterio is an Irish Canadian multi-platinum songwriter, composer, producer, actor, Professional Boxer and DJ, with a label called World Class Records, and music publishing company Amerada Music. He is also signed as an artist to various labels globally, including Sony Music.

Career
Mysterio first became recognized in 2007 for his first single "Answer This" (featuring Linda Newman). Mysterio's debut release, "Roll Wit It" was released in 2008 by Spinnin Records and featured the vocals of Chris Willis (singer of David Guetta anthems "Love Is Gone" and "Gettin' Over You").

On January 2, 2009, Mysterio released a cover remix version of "One More Time" by Daft Punk. The song reached #1 on Russia's Top 20, and was a club hit in the United States first played by Felli Fel on Power 106 in Los Angeles.

Mysterio released  "Tomorrow", featuring Samantha Fox, which debuted on radio worldwide on August 7, 2009, on stations worldwide, including: NRJ, Power 106, and Radio 538. It has since been signed by Sony Music. and included on Samantha Fox's Greatest Hits (2009) as the only track that was recent, as of that time.

His 2009 album release Redemption included collaborations with Samantha Fox, Gary Pine, Lillix, Tiff Lacey, Dhany, Chris Willis Shena and Yardi Don.

He then went on to tour Europe, Scandinavia and Russia. Included in this tour were live performances on NRJ, Radio 538 and BBC Radio 1 with Judge Jules.

2010-2020
In 2010, TMZ and Popeater reported that on August 23, 2010, Mysterio filed a lawsuit against Brandy Norwood seeking up to $6 million in damages. According to reports, Brandy had been paid $10,000 as a side artist fee to feature on Mysterio's debut album's lead single, "Shout It Out". The invoice and an email from her manager Ryan Ramsey confirming receipt of the funds have been published by British tabloid, Anorak. but then backed out of the deal. A subpoena was issued by the court ordering copies of videotapes of conversations between Mysterio and Brandy which were recorded by VH1 for her Family Business Season 2 Reality Show. The single "Shout It Out" without Brandy peaked at #47 on Mediabase Canada Hot AC Radio Chart Brandy later paid a settlement to Mysterio.

In 2012, Mysterio signed a global artist deal with Sony Music.
Sony Music partnered with Edmundo Andrada of Sveriges Radio (National Radio Sweden) and Etienne Dumon of CBC Radio for a radio documentary on Mysterio's career to date, concluding with the world debut of "Everything Is All Wrong". Interviewed for the documentary were friends DJ Riddler of WKTU & WHTZ as well as Craig Pereira of Sony Music and Matt Adell, CEO of Beatport.

Later in 2012, Mysterio re-wrote and re-produced The 2012 Eurovision Semi-Final Hungarian Entry of Kati Wolf, "What About My Dreams", in French re-titled "Dix Pas Cent Pas".

In 2013, Mysterio a collaborated with Flo Rida for a song entitled "Booty On The Floor". The song was released on Monday, June 10, 2013, on Beatport, with all profits from the Beatport Release to go to One Fund Boston, to benefit the victims and families of the Boston Marathon bombing.

In 2015, Mysterio wrote, composed, produced and sang on the duet charity single "Promised Land" with Crash Test Dummies featuring Mark Crozer on guitar and drums.
This was a follow-up of Marc's remix of Crash Test Dummies' 1993 single "Mmm Mmm Mmm Mmm" and charted in numerous countries, including Belgium, Greece, and Finland including #1 on Beatport and iTunes.

On February 5, 2016, "Promised Land" was released by Sony Music, marking his return to the major label release.

In June 2016, "Be The Truth" was released which reached #7 on both UK Music Week Official Club Chart and USA Billboard Next Big Sound Chart while ESPN Show FIRST TAKE used the hit as a theme song for December 2016.

On January 13, 2016, Trailer Park Boys and Bubbles finally released "Liquor & Whores" as an EDM track produced by Mysterio on Sony Music.

2020-present

Liquor & Whores was certified GOLD by the International Federation of the Phonographic Industry AUSTRIA in 2020.

Later in 2020, Marc's song Balans with Alexandra Stan and Mohombi was similary certified GOLD by IFPI Austria.

Marc Mysterio has also been credited as the composer for the Trailer Park Boys Television Series on Netflix where he has previously appeared on-screen as a DJ as a guest celebrity star.

Selected discography
Singles
 2008: "Roll Wit It" featuring Chris Willis (Spinnin' Records)
 2009: "One More Time" (Daft Punk Cover)   (World Class Records)
 2009: "Sunshine" featuring Gary Pine (Hi-Bias Records)
 2009: "Tomorrow" with Samantha Fox (Sony Music Entertainment)
 2010: "Shout It Out" (Armada Music)
 2011: "Let Loose" featuring Sandy Vee (Hi-Bias)
 2012: "Everything Is All Wrong" featuring Karl Wolf (Sony Music Entertainment)
 2012: "Dix Pas Cent Pas" by Kati Wolf featuring Marc Mysterio (Sony Music Entertainment)
 2013: "Booty On The Floor" by Marc Mysterio featuring Flo Rida (Sony Music Entertainment)
 2015: "Promised Land" by Marc Mysterio featuring Crash Test Dummies
 2014: Crash Test Dummies - "Mmm Mmm Mmm Mmm" (under name Marc Mysterio)
 2017: Phenomenal ( AJ Styles )
 2017: Liquor & Whores by Trailer Park Boys, Marc Mysterio ft Bubbles
 2018: Balans by Alexandra Stan, Mohombi ft Marc Mysterio
Remixes
 2007: David Guetta - "Delirious" (under name Marc Mysterio)
2018: Avicii - "Bromance" by Tim Berg (Marc Mysterio Remix)

References

External links
 Official Bio on Look To The Stars
 MySpace site
 Discogs

Year of birth missing (living people)
Living people
Canadian dance musicians
Club DJs
Remixers
Canadian male singers